Jiande railway station is a railway station in Jiande, Hangzhou, Zhejiang, China. It opened on 25 December 2018 along with the Hangzhou–Huangshan intercity railway.

It is the northern terminus of the currently under construction Hangzhou–Quzhou high-speed railway.

References 

Railway stations in Zhejiang
Railway stations in China opened in 2018